Caryocolum sciurella is a moth of the family Gelechiidae. It is found on the Canary Islands and Madeira.

The wingspan is 10–12 mm. The forewings are whitish grey, mottled, suffused and blotched with chestnut-brown and black. The hindwings are bluish grey. Adults are on wing from late February to mid-April.

References

Moths described in 1908
sciurella
Moths of Africa